Sunshine Lies is the tenth studio album by the alternative rock musician Matthew Sweet. It was released by Shout! Factory in 2008.

Recording
Several of Sweet's regular collaborators play on the album, including Ric Menck (drums), Ivan Julian (guitar), Greg Leisz (guitar / pedal steel guitar) and Richard Lloyd (guitar). Susanna Hoffs and Lisa Sweet (Sweet's wife) provide backing vocals on the title track. The album was recorded and mixed by Sweet.

Previews of the album had been available on Sweet's MySpace page with the title "Rock Bottom", although Sweet has said that the preview was put there by his manager and that he never had any intention of releasing the album with that title.

Release
The album had little commercial success, but favorable reviews. The review aggregating website Metacritic reports a normalized score of 71% based on 13 reviews. Sunshine Lies was released on CD, download and 2-LP vinyl. The vinyl set has four bonus tracks, while the iTunes download version has six bonus tracks (four of which also appear on the vinyl version).

Track listing

Personnel
Matthew Sweet – vocals, bass guitar, guitars, piano, organ, Mellotron, sound effects
Ric Menck – drums
Greg Leisz – guitar, pedal steel guitar, mandolin
Ivan Julian – guitar
Richard Lloyd – guitar
Susanna Hoffs – backing vocals on "Sunshine Lies"
Lisa Sweet – backing vocals on "Sunshine Lies"

References

2008 albums
Matthew Sweet albums
Shout! Factory albums
Albums produced by Matthew Sweet